George Henry Hotchkiss (July 1, 1906 – December 25, 1989) was an American professional basketball coach for the Oshkosh All-Stars in the United States' National Basketball League (NBL). He was the NBL Coach of the Year in 1940–41. During Hotchkiss' tenure, the All-Stars transitioned from being a barnstorming team in 1936–37 to a perennial NBL powerhouse, winning four straight regular season division or league titles from 1938 to 1941, made four straight NBL championship series appearances in that span, and won the league championship in 1941. He stepped down as coach after that season.

As a player, Hotchkiss played football and basketball for the University of Wisconsin in the 1920s. In basketball, he was named to the All-Big Ten Conference second-team as a senior in 1927–28. He then played for the Oshkosh All-Stars prior to the formation of the NBL in 1937–38.

In his post-basketball career, Hotchkiss was a self-employed insurance agent for Northwestern Mutual.

Head coaching record
The below season records reflect Hotchkiss' tenure as head coach when the Oshkosh All-Stars were in the NBL. In 1936–37 they were still a barnstorming team and that season is not counted toward official NBL coaching records.

|-
| align="left" |Oshkosh
| align="left" |1937–38
| 14||12||2||||align="center" |1st in Western||5||3||2|||| align="center" |Lost in NBL Finals
|-
| align="left" |Oshkosh
| align="left" |1938–30
| 28||17||11||||align="center" |1st in Western||5||2||3|||| align="center" |Lost in NBL Finals
|-
| align="left" |Oshkosh
| align="left" |1939–40
| 28||15||13||||align="center" |T–1st in Western||8||4||4|||| align="center" |Lost in NBL Finals
|- style="background:#FDE910;"
| align="left" |Oshkosh
| align="left" |1940–41
| 24||18||6||||align="center" |1st ||5||5||0|||| data-sort-value="1" align="center" |Won NBL Championship
|-
|-class="sortbottom"
| align="center" colspan="2"|Total
| 94||62||32|||| ||23||14||9||||

References

1906 births
1989 deaths
American men's basketball coaches
American men's basketball players
Basketball coaches from Wisconsin
Basketball players from Wisconsin
Guards (basketball)
Insurance agents
Oshkosh All-Stars coaches
Oshkosh All-Stars players
Players of American football from Wisconsin
Sportspeople from Oshkosh, Wisconsin
Wisconsin Badgers football players
Wisconsin Badgers men's basketball players